Pugh's Almanac was an annual almanac published in Queensland, Australia. It provided a guide to Queensland, and information about the events of the previous year and included several directories of commercial and non-commercial organisations.

History
It was founded by Theophilus Parsons Pugh, and published from 1859–1927.

See also
 Australian Blue Book
 Walch's Tasmanian Almanac

References

External links
 Pugh's Almanac,

Australian almanacs
History of Queensland
Publications established in 1859
Publications disestablished in 1927
1859 establishments in Australia